is an ethnically Korean Japanese singer, tarento and businesswoman from Tennōji-ku, Osaka, Osaka Prefecture.

She has various nicknames, one being "Akko". Due to her above-average height (174 cm or 5'8.5"), she is also nicknamed "jotei" (女帝), meaning "empress".

Biography
Akiko Wada is Japanese with Korean ethnicity. She was born Kim Bok-ja (Korean: 김복자,  Hanja: 金福子, Kim is the family name). Like many Zainichi Koreans, she also had a Japanese-style name for everyday use, . When she took Japanese citizenship, her name became , which upon marriage became .

She is signed to the Horipro entertainment agency.

Career
At age 17, she dropped out of school and performed in clubs. She was signed to the Horipro entertainment agency and released her debut single, "Hoshizora no Kodoku" in 1968 and had her first hit the next year with "Doshaburi no Ame no Naka de". She performed on Kōhaku Uta Gassen, a music show broadcast live every New Year's Eve, in 1970 and has performed over 30 times on the show since then. She received the award for Best Song at the 1972 Japan Record Awards for "Ano Kane wo Narasu no wa Anata".

She played the voice of Bowser in Super Mario Bros.: The Great Mission to Rescue Princess Peach!. She has also voiced Marge Simpson in the Japanese version of The Simpsons Movie.

She also performed with the music group M-Flo on the song "Hey!" on their 2005 album Beat Space Nine.

Wada performed at the famous Apollo Theater in Harlem, New York in September 2008 as part of her 40th debut anniversary tour.

Kōhaku Uta Gassen Appearances

References

External links

 
 
japan-zone.com article

1950 births
Living people
Horipro artists
Japanese women pop singers
Japanese women jazz singers
Japanese people of Korean descent
Japanese racehorse owners and breeders
Japanese radio personalities
Japanese rhythm and blues singers
Japanese television personalities
Japanese television presenters
21st-century Japanese businesswomen
21st-century Japanese businesspeople
Musicians from Osaka
Naturalized citizens of Japan
Warner Music Japan artists
20th-century Japanese women singers
20th-century Japanese singers
21st-century Japanese women singers
21st-century Japanese singers
Japanese women television presenters